Dorothy Ann Lee  (born 1953) is an Australian theologian and Anglican priest, formerly dean of the Trinity College Theological School, Melbourne, a college of the University of Divinity, and continuing as Frank Woods Distinguished Professor of New Testament. Her main research interests include the narrative and theology of the Gospels, particularly the Gospel of John, spirituality in the New Testament, the Transfiguration and Anglican worship.

Early life
Lee was born in Scotland. Her father was a Presbyterian minister and her childhood was shared between the United Kingdom and Australia. She studied classics at the University of Newcastle, New South Wales, graduating BA (Hons) in 1975 before completing a BD (Hons) in 1984 and a PhD in 1991 at the University of Sydney. She was ordained as a minister of the Uniting Church in Australia in 1984 before being received into the Anglican Church of Australia in 2008.

Academic career
Between 1983 and 1989, Lee lectured in New Testament at the University of Sydney and the United Theological College in Sydney. She then moved to Melbourne as lecturer at the Uniting Church Theological Hall, being appointed professor of New Testament in 1994. From 1998 to 2008 she also held the position of dean of chapel at Queen's College (University of Melbourne). After becoming an Anglican, Lee was appointed as lecturer at the Trinity College Theological School in 2008, becoming its dean in 2011.

Lee has acted as president of the Fellowship for Biblical Studies and is a member of the Doctrine Commission of the Anglican Church of Australia. She also holds an adjunct title of senior fellow in classics in the School of Historical Studies at the University of Melbourne.

In October 2012, Lee was elected one of the 10 foundation professors of the MCD University of Divinity, Australia's first specialist university. In October 2014 she was elected a canon of St Paul's Cathedral, Melbourne. She was elected a fellow of the Australian Academy of the Humanities in 2015.

Lee is the sister of Australian composer Ruth Lee Martin.

Selected works

Books

Articles and chapters

References

1953 births
Australian Anglican theologians
Australian biblical scholars
University of Sydney alumni
University of Newcastle (Australia) alumni
Living people
New Testament scholars
Australian Anglican priests
Converts to Anglicanism from Presbyterianism
Christian feminist theologians
Uniting Church in Australia ministers
21st-century Anglican priests
Anglican biblical scholars
Australian feminist writers
Women Christian theologians
Female biblical scholars
Christian feminist biblical scholars
Fellows of the Australian Academy of the Humanities
Academic staff of the University of Divinity